Machine ethics (or machine morality, computational morality, or computational ethics) is a part of the ethics of artificial intelligence concerned with adding or ensuring moral behaviors of man-made machines that use artificial intelligence, otherwise known as artificial intelligent agents. Machine ethics differs from other ethical fields related to engineering and technology.  Machine ethics should not be confused with computer ethics, which focuses on human use of computers. It should also be distinguished from the philosophy of technology, which concerns itself with the grander social effects of technology.

History
Before the 21st century the ethics of machines had largely been the subject of science fiction literature, mainly due to computing and artificial intelligence (AI) limitations. Although the definition of "Machine Ethics" has evolved since, the term was coined by Mitchell Waldrop in the 1987 AI Magazine article "A Question of Responsibility":"However, one thing that is apparent from the above discussion is that intelligent machines will embody values, assumptions, and purposes, whether their programmers consciously intend them to or not. Thus, as computers and robots become more and more intelligent, it becomes imperative that we think carefully and explicitly about what those built-in values are. Perhaps what we need is, in fact, a theory and practice of machine ethics, in the spirit of Asimov’s three laws of robotics."

In 2004, Towards Machine Ethics  was presented at the AAAI Workshop on Agent Organizations: Theory and Practice  in which theoretical foundations for machine ethics were laid out.

It was in the AAAI Fall 2005 Symposium on Machine Ethics where researchers met for the first time to consider implementation of an ethical dimension in autonomous systems.  A variety of perspectives of this nascent field can be found in the collected edition "Machine Ethics" that stems from the AAAI Fall 2005 Symposium on Machine Ethics.

In 2007, AI Magazine featured Machine Ethics: Creating an Ethical Intelligent Agent, an article that
discussed the importance of machine ethics, the need for machines that represent ethical principles explicitly, and the challenges facing those working on machine ethics. It also demonstrated that it is possible, at least in a limited domain, for a machine to abstract an ethical principle from examples of ethical judgments and use that principle to guide its own behavior.

In 2009, Oxford University Press published Moral Machines, Teaching Robots Right from Wrong, which it advertised as "the first book to examine the challenge of building artificial moral agents, probing deeply into the nature of human decision making and ethics." It cited some 450 sources, about 100 of which addressed major questions of machine ethics.

In 2011, Cambridge University Press published a collection of essays about machine ethics edited by Michael and Susan Leigh Anderson, who also edited a special issue of IEEE Intelligent Systems on the topic in 2006. The collection consists of the challenges of adding ethical principles to machines.

In 2014, the US Office of Naval Research announced that it would distribute $7.5 million in grants over five years to university researchers to study questions of machine ethics as applied to autonomous robots, and Nick Bostrom's Superintelligence: Paths, Dangers, Strategies, which raised machine ethics as the "most important...issue humanity has ever faced," reached #17 on the New York Times list of best selling science books.

In 2016 the European Parliament published a paper, (22-page PDF), to encourage the Commission to address the issue of robots' legal status, as described more briefly in the press. This paper included sections regarding the legal liabilities of robots, in which the liabilities were argued as being proportional to the robots' level of autonomy. The paper also brought into question the number of jobs that could be replaced by AI robots.

Definitions
James H. Moor, one of the pioneering theoreticians in the field of computer ethics, defines four kinds of ethical robots. As an extensive researcher on the studies of philosophy of artificial intelligence, philosophy of mind, philosophy of science, and logic, Moor defines machines to be ethical impact agents, implicit ethical agents, explicit ethical agents, or full ethical agents. A machine can be more than one type of agent.
Ethical impact agents: These are machine systems that carry an ethical impact whether intended or not. At the same time, these agents have the potential to act unethical. Moor gives a hypothetical example called the 'Goodman agent', named after philosopher Nelson Goodman. The Goodman agent compares dates but has the millennium bug. This bug resulted from programmers who represented dates with only the last two digits of the year. So any dates beyond 2000 would be misleadingly treated as earlier than those in the late twentieth century. Thus the Goodman agent was an ethical impact agent before 2000, and an unethical impact agent thereafter.
Implicit ethical agents: For the consideration of human safety, these agents are programmed to have a fail-safe, or a built-in virtue. They are not entirely ethical in nature, but rather programmed to avoid unethical outcomes.
Explicit ethical agents: These are machines that are capable of processing scenarios and acting on ethical decisions. Machines which have algorithms to act ethically.
Full ethical agents: These machines are similar to explicit ethical agents in being able to make ethical decisions. However, they also contain human metaphysical features. (i.e. have free will, consciousness and intentionality)
(See artificial systems and moral responsibility.)

Focuses of machine ethics

AI control problem 

Some scholars, such as philosopher Nick Bostrom and AI researcher Stuart Russell, argue that if AI surpasses humanity in general intelligence and becomes "superintelligent", then this new superintelligence could become powerful and difficult to control: just as the fate of the mountain gorilla depends on human goodwill, so might the fate of humanity depend on the actions of a future machine superintelligence.  In their respective books Superintelligence and Human Compatible, both scholars assert that while there is much uncertainty regarding the future of AI, the risk to humanity is great enough to merit significant action in the present.

This presents the AI control problem: how to build an intelligent agent that will aid its creators, while avoiding inadvertently building a superintelligence that will harm its creators. The danger of not designing control right "the first time," is that a superintelligence may be able to seize power over its environment and prevent humans from shutting it down. Potential AI control strategies include "capability control" (limiting an AI's ability to influence the world) and "motivational control" (one way of building an AI whose goals are aligned with human or optimal values).  There are a number of organizations researching the AI control problem, including the Future of Humanity Institute, the Machine Intelligence Research Institute, the Center for Human-Compatible Artificial Intelligence, and the Future of Life Institute.

Algorithms and training

AI paradigms have been debated over, especially in relation to their efficacy and bias. Nick Bostrom and Eliezer Yudkowsky have argued for decision trees (such as ID3) over neural networks and genetic algorithms on the grounds that decision trees obey modern social norms of transparency and predictability (e.g. stare decisis). In contrast, Chris Santos-Lang argued in favor of neural networks and genetic algorithms on the grounds that the norms of any age must be allowed to change and that natural failure to fully satisfy these particular norms has been essential in making humans less vulnerable than machines to criminal "hackers".

In 2009, in an experiment at the Laboratory of Intelligent Systems in the Ecole Polytechnique Fédérale of Lausanne in Switzerland, AI robots were programmed to cooperate with each other and tasked with the goal of searching for a beneficial resource while avoiding a poisonous resource. During the experiment, the robots were grouped into clans, and the successful members' digital genetic code was used for the next generation, a type of algorithm known as a genetic algorithm. After 50 successive generations in the AI, one clan's members discovered how to distinguish the beneficial resource from the poisonous one. The robots then learned to lie to each other in an attempt to hoard the beneficial resource from other robots.  In the same experiment, the same AI robots also learned to behave selflessly and signaled danger to other robots, and also died at the cost to save other robots. The implications of this experiment have been challenged by machine ethicists. In the Ecole Polytechnique Fédérale experiment, the robots' goals were programmed to be "terminal". In contrast, human motives typically have a quality of requiring never-ending learning.

Autonomous weapons systems 

In 2009, academics and technical experts attended a conference to discuss the potential impact of robots and computers and the impact of the hypothetical possibility that they could become self-sufficient and able to make their own decisions. They discussed the possibility and the extent to which computers and robots might be able to acquire any level of autonomy, and to what degree they could use such abilities to possibly pose any threat or hazard. They noted that some machines have acquired various forms of semi-autonomy, including being able to find power sources on their own and being able to independently choose targets to attack with weapons. They also noted that some computer viruses can evade elimination and have achieved "cockroach intelligence." They noted that self-awareness as depicted in science-fiction is probably unlikely, but that there were other potential hazards and pitfalls.

Some experts and academics have questioned the use of robots for military combat, especially when such robots are given some degree of autonomous functions. The US Navy has funded a report which indicates that as military robots become more complex, there should be greater attention to implications of their ability to make autonomous decisions. The President of the Association for the Advancement of Artificial Intelligence has commissioned a study to look at this issue. They point to programs like the Language Acquisition Device which can emulate human interaction.

Integration of Artificial General Intelligences with society 
Preliminary work has been conducted on methods of integrating artificial general intelligences (full ethical agents as defined above) with existing legal and social frameworks. Approaches have focused on consideration of their legal position and rights.

Machine learning bias 

Big data and machine learning algorithms have become popular among numerous industries including online advertising, credit ratings, and criminal sentencing, with the promise of providing more objective, data-driven results, but have been identified as a potential source for perpetuating social inequalities and discrimination.  A 2015 study found that women were less likely to be shown high-income job ads by Google's AdSense. Another study found that Amazon’s same-day delivery service was intentionally made unavailable in black neighborhoods. Both Google and Amazon were unable to isolate these outcomes to a single issue, but instead explained that the outcomes were the result of the black box algorithms they used.

The United States judicial system has begun using quantitative risk assessment software when making decisions related to releasing people on bail and sentencing in an effort to be more fair and to reduce an already high imprisonment rate. These tools analyze a defendant's criminal history among other attributes. In a study of 7,000 people arrested in Broward County, Florida, only 20% of the individuals predicted to commit a crime using the county's risk assessment scoring system proceeded to commit a crime.  A 2016 ProPublica report analyzed recidivism risk scores calculated by one of the most commonly used tools, the Northpointe COMPAS system, and looked at outcomes over two years. The report found that only 61% of those deemed high risk wound up committing additional crimes during that period. The report also flagged that African-American defendants were far more likely to be given high-risk scores relative to their white defendant counterparts. Legally, such pretrial risk assessments have been argued to violate Equal Protection rights on the basis of race, due to a number of factors including possible discriminatory intent from the algorithm itself under a theory of partial legal capacity for artificial intelligences.

In 2016, the Obama Administration's Big Data Working Group—an overseer of various big-data regulatory frameworks—released reports arguing “the potential of encoding discrimination in automated decisions” and calling for “equal opportunity by design” for applications such as credit scoring. The reports encourage discourse among policy makers, citizens, and academics alike, but recognizes that it does not have a potential solution for the encoding of bias and discrimination into algorithmic systems.

Ethical frameworks and practices

Practices
In March 2018, in an effort to address rising concerns over machine learning's impact on human rights, the World Economic Forum and Global Future Council on Human Rights published a white paper with detailed recommendations on how best to prevent discriminatory outcomes in machine learning. The World Economic Forum developed four recommendations based on the UN Guiding Principles of Human Rights to help address and prevent discriminatory outcomes in machine learning.

The World Economic Forum's recommendations are as follows:

 Active Inclusion: the development and design of machine learning applications must actively seek a diversity of input, especially of the norms and values of specific populations affected by the output of AI systems
 Fairness: People involved in conceptualizing, developing, and implementing machine learning systems should consider which definition of fairness best applies to their context and application, and prioritize it in the architecture of the machine learning system and its evaluation metrics
 Right to Understanding: Involvement of machine learning systems in decision-making that affects individual rights must be disclosed, and the systems must be able to provide an explanation of their decision-making that is understandable to end users and reviewable by a competent human authority. Where this is impossible and rights are at stake, leaders in the design, deployment, and regulation of machine learning technology must question whether or not it should be used
 Access to Redress: Leaders, designers, and developers of machine learning systems are responsible for identifying the potential negative human rights impacts of their systems. They must make visible avenues for redress for those affected by disparate impacts, and establish processes for the timely redress of any discriminatory outputs.

In January 2020, Harvard University's Berkman Klein Center for Internet and Society published a meta-study of 36 prominent sets of principles for AI, identifying eight key themes: privacy, accountability, safety and security, transparency and explainability, fairness and non-discrimination, human control of technology, professional responsibility, and promotion of human values. A similar meta-study was conducted by researchers from the Swiss Federal Institute of Technology in Zurich in 2019.

Approaches
Several attempts have been made to make ethics computable, or at least formal. Whereas Isaac Asimov's Three Laws of Robotics are usually not considered to be suitable for an artificial moral agent, it has been studied whether Kant's categorical imperative can be used. However, it has been pointed out that human value is, in some aspects, very complex. A way to explicitly surmount this difficulty is to receive human values directly from the humans through some mechanism, for example by learning them. Another approach is to base current ethical considerations on previous similar situations. This is called casuistry, and it could be implemented through research on the Internet. The consensus from a million past decisions would lead to a new decision that is democracy dependent. Prof. Bruce M. McLaren built an early (mid 1990s) computational model of casuistry, specifically a program called SIROCCO built with AI and case-base reasoning techniques that retrieves and analyzes ethical dilemmas. This approach could, however, lead to decisions that reflect biases and unethical behaviors exhibited in society. The negative effects of this approach can be seen in Microsoft's Tay (bot), where the chatterbot learned to repeat racist and sexually charged messages sent by Twitter users.

One thought experiment focuses on a Genie Golem with unlimited powers presenting itself to the reader. This Genie declares that it will return in 50 years and demands that it be provided with a definite set of morals that it will then immediately act upon. The purpose of this experiment is to initiate a discourse over how best to handle defining complete set of ethics that computers may understand.

In fiction
In science fiction, movies and novels have played with the idea of sentience in robots and machines.

Neil Blomkamp's Chappie (2015) enacted a scenario of being able to transfer one's consciousness into a computer. The film, Ex Machina (2014) by Alex Garland, followed an android with artificial intelligence undergoing a variation of the Turing Test, a test administered to a machine to see if its behavior can be distinguishable to that of a human's. Works such as Terminator (1984) and The Matrix (1999) incorporate the concept of machines turning on their human masters (See Artificial Intelligence).

Isaac Asimov considered the issue in the 1950s in I, Robot.  At the insistence of his editor John W. Campbell Jr., he proposed the Three Laws of Robotics to govern artificially intelligent systems.  Much of his work was then spent testing the boundaries of his three laws to see where they would break down, or where they would create paradoxical or unanticipated behavior. His work suggests that no set of fixed laws can sufficiently anticipate all possible circumstances. In  Philip K. Dick's novel, Do Androids Dream of Electric Sheep? (1968), he explores what it means to be human. In his post-apocalyptic scenario, he questioned if empathy was an entirely human characteristic. His story is the basis for the science fiction film, Blade Runner (1982).

Related fields

 Affective computing
 Formal ethics
 Bioethics
 Computational theory of mind
 Computer ethics
 Ethics of artificial intelligence
 Moral psychology
 Philosophy of artificial intelligence
 Philosophy of mind

See also

 Artificial intelligence
 AI safety
 AI takeover
 Artificial intelligence in fiction
 Friendly artificial intelligence
 Automating medical decision-support
 Google car
 Military robot
 Machine Intelligence Research Institute
 Robot ethics
 Space law
 Self-replicating spacecraft
 Watson project for automating medical decision-support
 Tay (bot)

Notes

External links
 Machine Ethics, Interdisciplinary project on machine ethics.
 The Machine Ethics Podcast, Podcast discussing Machine Ethics, AI and Tech ethics.

References
 Wallach, Wendell; Allen, Colin (November 2008). Moral Machines: Teaching Robots Right from Wrong. USA: Oxford University Press.
 Anderson, Michael; Anderson, Susan Leigh, eds (July 2011). Machine Ethics. Cambridge University Press. 
 Storrs Hall, J. (May 30, 2007). Beyond AI: Creating the Conscience of the Machine Prometheus Books.
 Moor, J. (2006). The Nature, Importance, and Difficulty of Machine Ethics. IEEE Intelligent Systems, 21(4), pp. 18–21.
 Anderson, M. and Anderson, S. (2007). Creating an Ethical Intelligent Agent. AI Magazine, Volume 28(4).

Further reading
 Hagendorff, Thilo (2021). Linking Human And Machine Behavior: A New Approach to Evaluate Training Data Quality for Beneficial Machine Learning. Minds and Machines, . 
 Anderson, Michael; Anderson, Susan Leigh, eds (July/August 2006). "Special Issue on Machine Ethics". IEEE Intelligent Systems 21 (4): 10–63.
 Bendel, Oliver (December 11, 2013). Considerations about the Relationship between Animal and Machine Ethics. AI & SOCIETY, .
 Dabringer, Gerhard, ed. (2010). "Ethical and Legal Aspects of Unmanned Systems. Interviews". Austrian Ministry of Defence and Sports, Vienna 2010, .
 Gardner, A. (1987). An Artificial Approach to Legal Reasoning. Cambridge, MA: MIT Press.
 Georges, T. M. (2003). Digital Soul: Intelligent Machines and Human Values. Cambridge, MA: Westview Press.
 Singer, P.W. (December 29, 2009). Wired for War: The Robotics Revolution and Conflict in the 21st Century: Penguin.

Argument technology
Machine
Computing and society
Ethics of science and technology
Philosophy of artificial intelligence